HSwMS Puke (19) was a  of the Swedish Navy from 1940 to 1947. The ship was purchased from Italy by Sweden in 1940, along with her sister ship HSwMS Psilander. Puke was scrapped in 1949.

Design and description

The Sella-class destroyers were enlarged and improved versions of the preceding   and es. Their complement was 8–9 officers and 144 enlisted men.

The Sellas were powered by two Parsons geared steam turbines, each driving one propeller shaft using steam supplied by three Thornycroft boilers.

Their main battery consisted of four  guns in one twin-gun turret aft of the superstructure and one single-gun turret forward of it. Anti-aircraft (AA) defense for the Sella-class ships was provided by a pair of  AA guns in single mounts amidships and a pair of  machine guns. They were equipped with four  torpedo tubes in two twin mounts amidships. The Sellas could also carry 32 mines.

Construction and career
Bettino Ricasoli, named after the Italian Prime Minister Bettino Ricasoli, was laid down by Pattinson at their Naples shipyard on 11 January 1923, launched on 29 January 1926 and commissioned on 11 December. The forward single-gun turret was replaced by a twin-gun turret in 1929.

Sale to Sweden
In December 1939, a Swedish commission to Italy departed to investigate the possibility for Sweden to buy warships. This led to the acquisition of the Psilander and Romulus-classes. On 14 April 1940, all four destroyers left La Spezia and on 10 July the ships arrived in Gothenburg where the ship was renamed for Admiral Johan af Puke.

Swedish service
After arriving in Sweden, Puke was put into service in the Gothenburg Squadron. Over time, the ship was found to be too weakly built and rolled heavily in heavy seas, which meant that reinforcements had to be made and bilge keels had to be mounted on the hull. In addition, the low freeboard of the stern caused it to be flooded in bad weather. In the years 1941–1942 the ships armament were modified. The air defense was changed to two 40 mm anti-aircraft automatic guns m/36 and two dual 8 mm anti-aircraft machine guns m/36. The 45 cm torpedoes was changed to 53 cm torpedoes and depth charge throwers and rack-deployed depth charges were installed. After a very short service, the ships were placed in reserve between 1943 and 1944.

Fate
Puke was decommissioned on 13 June 1947, after which she was used for shooting and exploding tests before she finally was scrapped in Karlskrona in 1949.

References

Notes

Bibliography

Web
 Miramar Ship Index

External links

 Bettino Ricasoli Marina Militare website

Bettino Ricasoli
Ships built in Naples
1926 ships
Psilander-class destroyers